Zangavai-ye Olya (also Romanized as Zangavāī-ye ‘Olyā; also known as Zangavā and Zangī Vā) is a village in Chenar Rural District, Kabgian District, Dana County, Kohgiluyeh and Boyer-Ahmad Province, Iran. At the 2006 census, its population was 38, in 9 families.

References 

Populated places in Dana County